The 2019–20 Houston Cougars men's basketball team represented the University of Houston during the 2019–20 NCAA Division I men's basketball season. The Cougars were led by sixth-year head coach Kelvin Sampson as members of the American Athletic Conference. This was the second season that the team played its home games at the Fertitta Center.

Previous season
Houston finished the 2018–19 regular season 29–2, including an AAC-best 16–2 record in conference play. They were the runner-up in the American Athletic Conference tournament, falling 69–57 to Cincinnati in the final. The Cougars earned the #3 seed in the Midwest Region of the NCAA tournament, where they went 2–1, advancing to the Sweet Sixteen before falling 62–58 to Kentucky.  Houston's final overall season record of 33–4 set a program record for wins.

Shortly after the conclusion of the 2018–19 season, Kelvin Sampson agreed to a six-season contract to remain Head Coach at Houston.

Offseason

Departures

Incoming transfers

Recruiting class of 2020

AAC media poll
The AAC media poll was released on October 14, 2019, with the Cougars tied for first place with the Memphis Tigers. However, the Cougars received more 1st place votes in the poll.

Roster

Schedule and results

|-
!colspan=12 style=| Exhibition

|-
!colspan=12 style=| Non-conference regular season

|-
!colspan=12 style=| AAC regular season

|-
!colspan=12 style=| AAC Tournament

1.Cancelled due to the Coronavirus Pandemic

Rankings

*Coaches did not release a Week 2 poll

Awards and honors

American Athletic Conference honors

All-AAC Second Team
Nate Hinton
Caleb Mills

All Freshman Team
Caleb Mills

Player of the Week
Week 5: Quentin Grimes
Week 8: Fabian White Jr.

Rookie of the Week
Week 6: Caleb Mills
Week 12: Caleb Mills
Week 17: Marcus Sasser

Source

References

Houston
Houston Cougars men's basketball seasons
Houston
Houston